Champion's leaf-tailed gecko (Phyllurus championae), also known commonly as the Koumala leaf-tailed gecko, is a species of gecko, a lizard in the family Carphodactylidae. The species is endemic to Australia.

Etymology
The specific name, championae (genitive, feminine), is in honor of Australian zoologist Irene Champion, a Resource Ranger with the Queensland Parks and Wildlife Service.

Geographic range
P. championae was first found in the Cameron Creek/Black Mountain area near Koumala, Queensland, Australia.

Habitat
The preferred natural habitat of P. championae is forest with rocky areas.

Description

Reproduction
P. championae is oviparous.

References

Further reading
Cogger HG (2014). Reptiles and Amphibians of Australia, Seventh Edition. Clayton, Victoria, Australia: CSIRO Publishing. xxx + 1,033 pp. . (Phyllurus championae, p. 273).
Couper PJ, Schneider CJ, Hoskin CJ, Covacevich JA (2000). "Australian leaf-tailed geckos: phylogeny, a new genus, two new species and other new data". Memoirs of the Queensland Museum 45 (2): 253–265. (Phyllurus championae, new species, pp. 258–262, Figures 6, 7A, 7B).
Hoskin CJ, Couper PJ, Schneider CJ (2003). "A New Species of Phyllurus (Lacertilia: Gekkonidae) and a Revised Phylogeny and Key for the Australian Leaf-tailed Geckos". Australian Journal of Zoology 51 (2): 153–164.
Wilson S, Swan G (2013). A Complete Guide to Reptiles of Australia, Fourth Edition. Sydney: New Holland Publishers. 522 pp. .

Phyllurus
Reptiles described in 2000
Geckos of Australia
Endemic fauna of Australia
Taxa named by Patrick J. Couper
Taxa named by Christopher J. Schneider (herpetologist)
Taxa named by Conrad J. Hoskin
Taxa named by Jeanette Covacevich